Kaspersky Internet Security (often abbreviated to KIS) is an internet security suite developed by Kaspersky Lab compatible with Microsoft Windows and Mac OS X. Kaspersky Internet Security offers protection from malware, as well as email spam, phishing and hacking attempts, and data leaks. Kaspersky Lab Diagnostics results are distributed to relevant developers through the MIT License.

Windows edition

Version 2007 (6.0)
Version 6.0 was the first release of KIS. PC World magazine praised version 6.0's detection of malware. KIS detected 100 percent of threats on a subset of the January 2006 wild-list, a list of prevalent threats. The suite detected almost 100 (99.57%) percent of adware samples. KIS has the ability to scan within compressed or packed files, detecting 83.3 percent of the "hidden" malware. However, version 6.0 was criticized for not completely removing malware by leaving Registry entries and files. PC World also highlighted the suite's false positives — eight of 20,000 clean files were incorrectly flagged as malicious — and its noticeable impact on computer performance. However, data is cached from each scan, making each subsequent scan faster. The firewall blocked all attacks from inside and outside the computer when tested.

The magazine found the graphical user interface to be awkward to navigate. Features such as parental controls and instant messaging protection, found in competing suites from Symantec and McAfee, were not a part of version 6.0. Both CNET and PC World criticized the suite's relatively high retail price, US$79.95.

KIS 6.0 supports Windows 98 SE, ME, NT Workstation 4.0, 2000 Professional, XP Home Edition, XP Professional, XP Professional x64, and Vista. 50 megabytes of free space, Internet Explorer 5.5, and Windows Installer 2.0 are required. RAM and CPU requirements are dependent on the operating system.

Version 2008 (7.0)
Version 7.0 introduced a redesigned GUI. Components were renamed and reorganized; the Anti-hacker module was renamed to the Firewall, and the Anti-Spy module was integrated with the Privacy Control module. PC World described the new interface as "intuitive" and "great-looking".

Parental controls were introduced, with specific settings for different age categories, such as "child" or "parent". Within age categories are content categories, such as drugs or violence. Users can manually configure profiles. Filtering profiles can be associated with users. Since content is filtered at the network level, the feature will work with any Internet browser. The filter relies on a database of known URLs and can analyse websites in real-time. Attempts to access forbidden URLs are logged, and sites visited are tracked as well, raising privacy issues. Limits on Internet access may be set based on time, and chat rooms along with webmail sites can be manually blocked.

Spam filtering integrates with Microsoft Outlook, Outlook Express, Windows Mail, and The Bat!. E-mail content is analysed and scored, and e-mail with scores above two specified thresholds are either marked as "!!spam" or "??probably spam". The Mail Dispatcher feature shows subject and sender information for messages, and allows users to avoid downloading blatant spam by selecting which messages to download. The filter self-trains by analyzing incoming and outgoing e-mail not marked as spam, or by analyzing folders only containing spam or valid e-mail. Senders of verified valid e-mail are whitelisted. E-mail can also be whitelisted or blacklisted based on phrases present in the text. E-mail with non-ASCII characters or invisible text can also be blocked. However, version 7.0 had a relatively poor showing, misidentifying 30 percent of valid messages in PC Magazine testing. 30 percent of spam also made to the inbox.

Protection against data leaks was incorporated in this release. The suite warns users when programs attempt to access or send data from certain areas, such as where Internet Explorer stores webform information.

Malware protection was mostly positive in detection and disinfection tests by AV-Test.org. Version 7.0 detected 100 percent of wildlist threats. Using one-month-old signatures and a set of new malware, however, detection fell to 14 percent. Files were scanned at 5.24 megabytes per second. Version 7.0 successfully identified all six actively running rootkits, four of six inactive rootkits, and was only able to remove two of six rootkits. The firewall correctly blocked all attempted outside connections, with a reasonable level of security when left on default settings.

This version drops support for the Windows 98, 2000, and NT. Windows XP Service Pack 2 is required, except in the case of XP Professional x64 edition. Vista is supported as well. RAM and CPU requirements are dependent on the operating system. 75 megabytes of free space, Internet Explorer 5.5, and Windows Installer 2.0.

Version 2009 (8.0)
This version introduces a revised user interface, an application filtering module, an updated anti-virus engine, and a vulnerability scanner. The main window separates settings in four categories, compared to eight in its predecessor. A status bar changes colour (green, yellow, and red) to reflect overall program status and flashes to divert attention when needed. PC Magazine also noted pop-up notifications were kept to a minimum.

Kaspersky claims the core anti-virus engine was revised to increase scan speed. PC Magazine found an initial scan took over two hours, however subsequent scans took two minutes to complete. However, malware detection was relatively low in comparison to other anti-virus applications tested. Out of 650 thousand samples, version 8.0 detected 95.6 percent. The top score was around 99 percent. Using two-week-old signatures, version 8.0 detected 52 percent of viruses in a different set of samples. Kaspersky also blocked about 60 percent of malware based solely on behaviour. The top performers scored 55.3 percent and 80 percent respectively. Version 2009 detected 98.1 percent of adware. However, PC World noted to achieve that kind of performance, users will have to modify program settings. On default settings, KIS allowed Zango to install. To block the installation, users must enable KIS to scan for "other malware".

The Security Analyzer looks for operating system and program patches. It also looks for vulnerable system settings, presenting users with a list of recommended actions to prevent malware from gaining access to a system. However, PC World criticized the amount of computer jargon used and lack of information about how adjust settings appropriately. On the other hand, PC Magazine found the feature straightforward, and often the solution involved downloading and installing an update.

KIS uses a whitelist by Carbon Black to classify trusted and malicious programs. Malicious programs are not allowed to run at all. Unknown programs falling in between the two categories are restricted in the actions they can perform. Its firewall blocked all attacks in PC Magazine testing. Phishing protection was introduced in this release. Testing by PC Magazine found the feature blocked 44 percent of phishing URLs. Internet Explorer 7 blocked 67 percent of the URLs, and Mozilla Firefox blocked 81 percent.

Spam filtering now integrates with Mozilla Thunderbird and scans NNTP traffic. Spam can be automatically diverted to its own folder. When using an unsupported e-mail client to download POP3, IMAP or NNTP mail, Kaspersky will still generate a report of all messages. However, in an unsupported client, there will be no toolbar nor will the program classify any messages as spam in the client itself.

Version 2010 (9.0)
Version 2010 of Kaspersky Internet Security introduced an overhauled user interface and a sandbox for running applications in a virtualized environment. The 9.0.0.736 build of KIS 2010 fully supported the Windows 7 operating system.

Version 2011 (11.0)
The beta version was released for all windows users on 8 June 2010.  This version included a new interface, as well as a gadget only available for Windows Vista and Windows 7 users.  PC Mag rated this version "very good" (4/5 stars).  Its firewall was noted to be very good, but that made up for its only adequate malware detection rates. Two critical fixes have been released by Kaspersky Lab, making the current version 11.0.2.556.

Version 2012 (12.0)
On 1 March 2011, Kaspersky released the first build of version 2012, it came out as beta version and in English, French and Russian version, with more versions due out later. On 7 June 2011 Kaspersky Lab announced the commercial release of Kaspersky Internet Security 2012 in France, Germany, Switzerland. The current version is 12.0.0.374.

Version 2013 (13.0)
The beta version was released for all windows users on 3 March 2012.  This version includes an interface which looks (currently, at least) much like Internet Security 2012. There is no Safe Run option, no Proactive Defense, while instead the behavioural monitoring System Watcher seems to be taking greater responsibility for detecting malware and a Safe Banking feature has been added.

The release candidate (build 13.0.1.4088 RC) was released for all windows users on 20 July 2012.

The Final Version was released on 28 August 2012 build 13.0.1.4190

Version 2014 (14.0)
Beta testing started on 12 March 2013. This version introduced a Windows 8 like GUI design. The final version was released on 3 August 2013 build 14.0.0.4651 in India and Russia, then on August 13 in the US and August 27 in the UK. The 2014 release was frequently characterized as inferior to user expectations, largely due to its removal of a range of granular fine-tuning options in 2013 and earlier, which were used by experienced users; a number of these were added back in the 2015 beta by the time of its technical release (build 463).

As of February 13, 2014 build 14.0.0.4651(E) was released. Build 14.0.0.4651(I) is the latest (current) version.

Version 2015 (15.0)
In April 2014, a beta version of the 2015 product, build 463, was released, followed by a technical release preview, of the near-complete 2015 product. The first official release of the product was in Bangladesh in June 2014.

Version 2017 (17.0)

Version 2018 (18.0)

Version 2019 (19.0)

Version 2020 (20.0)

Version 2021 (21.0)

Controversies regarding security
In March 2015, Bloomberg accused Kaspersky of having close ties to Russian military and intelligence officials. 
Kaspersky slammed the claims in his blog, calling the coverage "sensationalist" and guilty of "exploiting paranoia" to "increase readership".

As a result of alleged Russian involvement in the 2016 Presidential Election and ongoing investigations, the Department of Homeland Security officially banned the use of the Kaspersky Internet Security by the United States federal government in September, 2017.

As of December 12, 2017, the use of Kaspersky software is banned from use by the American federal government by law.

See also

 Antivirus software
 Internet Security
 Comparison of antivirus software
 Comparison of firewalls
 Comparison of computer viruses
 Eugene Kaspersky
 Natalya Kaspersky
 Kaspersky Anti-Virus
 Kaspersky Lab

References

External links
 

2006 software
Antivirus software
Firewall software
Security software
Proprietary software
Windows security software
MacOS security software
Linux security software